Akua Obeng-Akrofi (born 10 July 1996) is a Ghanaian sprinter. She competed in the women's 4 × 100 metres relay at the 2017 World Championships in Athletics.

She graduated from Columbia University in 2018.

References

External links

1996 births
Living people
Ghanaian female sprinters
World Athletics Championships athletes for Ghana
Athletes (track and field) at the 2018 Commonwealth Games
Place of birth missing (living people)
Columbia Lions women's track and field athletes
Commonwealth Games competitors for Ghana
Columbia University alumni